Khoon Bhari Maang is a 1988 Indian Hindi-language action thriller film directed and produced by Rakesh Roshan. Based on the Australian mini-series Return to Eden (1983), it stars Rekha as a wealthy widow who is almost killed by her second husband and sets out for revenge. The film was a comeback venture for Rekha, and was a critical and commercial success. It received seven nominations at the 34th Filmfare Awards, including for Best Film and Best Director for Roshan, and won Rekha her second Best Actress award. Khoon Bhari Maang was released on 12 August 1988.

Synopsis
Aarti Verma (Rekha) is a widow with two children. She is considered ‘unattractive’ due to a large birthmark on her face. Aarti's husband (Rakesh Roshan) died in a car accident under mysterious circumstances, and her father (Saeed Jaffrey) is one of the richest and most famous businessmen in the city. When her father is suddenly murdered by his worker Hiralal (Kader Khan), Aarti loses all sense of purpose in life, except bringing up her children. Hiralal pretends to be a friend, and takes care of her like a father. He brings his poor nephew Sanjay (Kabir Bedi) from abroad, who is romantically involved with Aarti's best friend Nandini (Sonu Walia). Although Nandini is fond of Aarti, she is intensely in love with Sanjay, and agrees to help him rob Aarti of her wealth. Slowly, Sanjay gets close to Aarti's children. Nandini and the rest of the family convince Aarti to marry Sanjay. The day after the wedding, Aarti, Sanjay, and Nandini go on a short trip, during which, Sanjay pushes Aarti from a rowboat into crocodile-infested waters hoping that she would die. The crocodile mauls Aarti and mutilates her body and face. However, Aarti's body is not found; since Sanjay cannot inherit her wealth until death is established beyond any reasonable doubt, he becomes abusive to Aarti’s children and pets. Meanwhile, Aarti is rescued by an old farmer who nurses her back to health.

A few months later, the horribly disfigured Aarti decides to return to the city, and avenge herself and her family. She exchanges her expensive diamond earrings for a huge amount of money that she uses to pay for extensive plastic surgery. She transforms into a ‘beautiful’ woman, very different from her earlier self, and decided to go after Nandini, who is now a successful model. In order to challenge her popularity, Aarti approaches the same modelling agency (Kraft advertising agency) that represents Nandini and introduces herself as Jyoti. The photographer JD (Shatrughan Sinha) spots her beauty and vows to make her the topmost model in the town, even more successful than Nandini. Soon Jyoti's popularity takes over Nandini, and out of frustration, she challenges Jyoti for a dance performance in which she loses. Nandini soon becomes jobless, and Jyoti's first target gets settled. Meanwhile, Sanjay gets smitten by Jyoti's beauty and is no longer interested in Nandini. He tries various ways to woo her and seduce her but fails every time. Later, Jyoti finds out that her children have stopped going to school. Jyoti lures in Sanjay to invite her to her own home, where she lived with her pets and children. Although the pets recognize Jyoti as Aarti, the children fail to do so. Jyoti finds out about all misdeeds of Sanjay and Hiralal through the children, including the murder of Ramu Kaka, the servant (A K Hangal) and her father.

JD gets suspicious about Jyoti's actions and shows his concern for her. He offers help as a friend, which Jyoti declines. JD ultimately finds out that Jyoti is none other than Aarti, who has come back to exact revenge on her wrong doers. Meanwhile, Jyoti sets her second target, her uncle Hiralal, sneaks into his house at midnight and kills him. She then calls Nandini and tells her that she is taking Sanjay with him at Sitapur farm (the same place where Aarti was attacked). JD asks Aarti's children to tell about Jyoti's whereabouts as her life is in danger. He reveals to them the secret about Jyoti being their mother. Sanjay brings Jyoti to the farmhouse. Nandini also reaches there and confronts Sanjay. She threatens to expose him to Jyoti and will not let her suffer like Aarti. Jyoti confronts them both and finally reveals herself as Aarti. Aarti vows to take revenge from Sanjay in the similar fashion to the way he tried to kill her. Aarti fights Sanjay, and in the process, Nandini sacrifices herself to save Aarti. Aarti, with the help of her pet horse Raja, drags Sanjay to the same spot with Crocodile infested waters. Aarti tries her best to knock Sanjay off the cliff, but Sanjay turns around and pushes her down.

JD reaches the spot, saves Aarti, and fights Sanjay. After a brief fight, he knocks Sanjay out, and he rolls down the cliff, hanging upside down. He asks Aarti for forgiveness. Aarti recalls that horrific incident when she was pushed into the lake and brutally attacked by the crocodile. Aarti knocks Sanjay one last time with a wooden rod, and he falls down the cliff and gets devoured by the crocodile. Aarti reunites with her family and pets.

Cast
 Rekha as Aarti Saxena / Jyoti Verma
 Kabir Bedi as Sanjay Verma
 Sonu Walia as Nandini
 Kader Khan as Heeralal
 Shatrughan Sinha as J.D.
 Rakesh Roshan as Vikram Saxena 
 Saeed Jaffrey as Mr. Saxena 
 Mangal Dhillon as Advocate
 Satyajeet as Baliya
 Sulochana Latkar as J.D.'s Mother
 Paidi Jairaj as Baba
 Tom Alter as Plastic Surgeon 
 Shubha Khote as Veterinary Animal Doctor 
 A. K. Hangal as Ramu 
 Sulabha Deshpande as Leela
 Shweta Rastogi as Kavita

Production 
Khoon Bhari Maang was announced by Rakesh Roshan in January 1988, with the media reporting Rekha would star as the film's lead.

Music
The film has four songs composed by Rajesh Roshan:
 "Hanste Hanste Kat Jayen Raste" - Nitin Mukesh, Sadhana Sargam
 "Jeene Ke Bahane Lakhon Hain" - Asha Bhosle
 "Main Haseena Ghazab Ki" - Asha Bhosle, Sadhana Sargam
 "Main Teri Hoon Janam" - Sadhana Sargam
 "Hanste Hanste Kat Jayen Raste" - Sadhana Sargam, Sonali

The song "Main Teri Hoon Jaanam" is lifted from the theme song of the British film Chariots of Fire.

Reception
Reviews towards Khoon Bhari Maang were positive, with most of the critics' praise being directed towards Rekha's performance. In a 2000 article reviewing the last two decades in Hindi cinema, Bhawana Somaaya from The Hindu wrote: "Rakesh Roshan offers Rekha the role of a lifetime in Khoon Bhari Maang." M.L. Dhawan from The Tribune, while documenting the famous Hindi films of 1988, argued: "With Khoon Bhari Maang, Rakesh Roshan destroyed the myth that it was essential to have a hero as the protagonist and that heroines were there just to serve as interludes and mannenquins." 

Dhawan further noted: "This fast-paced movie was a crowning glory for Rekha, who rose like a phoenix in this remake of Return to Eden, and bedazzled the audience with her daredevilry." An unofficial remake of Return to Eden, the film was remade in Telugu as Gowthami starring Suhasini , in Tamil as Thendral Sudum starring Radhika, in Kannada as Jwaalaa starring Mohini and in Odia as Nari Bi Pindhipare Rakta Sindura starring Rachna Banerjee.

Awards
34th Filmfare Awards:

Won
 Best Actress – Rekha
 Best Supporting Actress – Sonu Walia 
 Best Editing – Sanjay Verma
Nominated
 Best Film – Rakesh Roshan
 Best Director – Rakesh Roshan
 Best Music Director – Rajesh Roshan
 Best Female Playback Singer – Sadhana Sargam for "Main Teri Hoon Jaanam"

References

External links

1980s Hindi-language films
1988 action thriller films
1988 films
Indian action thriller films
Films scored by Rajesh Roshan
Films about domestic violence
Indian remakes of foreign films
Indian films about revenge
Films directed by Rakesh Roshan
Films about women in India
Hindi films remade in other languages
Films about crocodilians
Films about dogs
Films about pets